Jagger: Rebel, Rock Star, Rambler, Rogue is a biography and cultural examination of The Rolling Stones' frontman Mick Jagger's life and the cultural revolution he led. The book was written by Marc Spitz and originally released on September 8, 2011 by Gotham Books.

Release 
Jagger: Rebel, Rock Star, Rambler, Rogue was first published in the United States in hardback and e-book format on September 8, 2011 through Gotham Books. The book was given a release in German and Swedish through Hambel Edel Books and Bokförlaget NoNa the following year, respectively.

Reception
Janet Maslin, writing for The New York Times, reviewed the book negatively, calling it an "eager hagiography" of Jagger that was written in response to Life, a memoir by Keith Richards.

References

The Rolling Stones
Mick Jagger
Biographies (books)
2011 non-fiction books
Gotham Books books